A mandala is a geometric configuration of symbols. In various spiritual traditions, mandalas may be employed for focusing attention of practitioners and adepts, as a spiritual guidance tool, for establishing a sacred space and as an aid to meditation and trance induction. In the Eastern religions of Hinduism, Buddhism, Jainism and Shinto it is used as a map representing deities, or especially in the case of Shinto, paradises, kami or actual shrines. A mandala generally represents the spiritual journey, starting from outside to the inner core, through layers.

Hinduism

In Hinduism, a basic mandala, also called a yantra, takes the form of a square with four gates containing a circle with a center point. Each gate is in the general shape of a T. Mandalas often have radial balance.

A yantra is similar to a mandala, usually smaller and using a more limited colour palette. It may be a two- or three-dimensional geometric composition used in sadhanas, puja or meditative rituals, and may incorporate a mantra into its design. It is considered to represent the abode of the deity. Each yantra is unique and calls the deity into the presence of the practitioner through the elaborate symbolic geometric designs. According to one scholar, "Yantras function as revelatory symbols of cosmic truths and as instructional charts of the spiritual aspect of human experience"

Many situate yantras as central focus points for Hindu tantric practice. Yantras are not representations, but are lived, experiential, nondual realities. As Khanna describes:

The term 'mandala' appears in the Rigveda as the name of the sections of the work, and Vedic rituals use mandalas such as the Navagraha mandala to this day.

Buddhism

Vajrayana

In Vajrayana Buddhism, mandalas have been developed also into sandpainting. They are also a key part of Anuttarayoga Tantra meditation practices.

Visualisation of Vajrayana teachings

The man mandala can be shown to represent in visual form the core essence of the Vajrayana teachings. The mandala represents the nature of the Pure Land, Enlightened mind.

An example of this type of mandala is Vajrabhairava mandala a silk tapestry woven with gilded paper depicting lavish elements like crowns and jewelry, which gives a three-dimensional effect to the piece.

Mount Meru

A mandala can also represent the entire universe, which is traditionally depicted with Mount Meru as the axis mundi in the center, surrounded by the continents. One example is the Cosmological Mandala with Mount Meru, a silk tapestry from the Yuan dynasty that serves as a diagram of the Tibetan cosmology, which was given to China from Nepal and Tibet.

Wisdom and impermanence

In the mandala, the outer circle of fire usually symbolises wisdom. The ring of eight charnel grounds represents the Buddhist exhortation to be always mindful of death, and the impermanence with which samsara is suffused: "such locations were utilized in order to confront and to realize the transient nature of life". Described elsewhere: "within a flaming rainbow nimbus and encircled by a black ring of dorjes, the major outer ring depicts the eight great charnel grounds, to emphasize the dangerous nature of human life". Inside these rings lie the walls of the mandala palace itself, specifically a place populated by deities and Buddhas.

Five Buddhas

One well-known type of mandala is the mandala of the "Five Buddhas", archetypal Buddha forms embodying various aspects of enlightenment. Such Buddhas are depicted depending on the school of Buddhism, and even the specific purpose of the mandala. A common mandala of this type is that of the Five Wisdom Buddhas (a.k.a. Five Jinas), the Buddhas Vairocana, Aksobhya, Ratnasambhava, Amitabha and Amoghasiddhi. When paired with another mandala depicting the Five Wisdom Kings, this forms the Mandala of the Two Realms.

Practice

Mandalas are commonly used by tantric Buddhists as an aid to meditation.

The mandala is "a support for the meditating person", something to be repeatedly contemplated to the point of saturation, such that the image of the mandala becomes fully internalised in even the minutest detail and can then be summoned and contemplated at will as a clear and vivid visualized image. With every mandala comes what Tucci calls "its associated liturgy ... contained in texts known as tantras", instructing practitioners on how the mandala should be drawn, built and visualised, and indicating the mantras to be recited during its ritual use.

By visualizing "pure lands", one learns to understand experience itself as pure, and as the abode of enlightenment. The protection that we need, in this view, is from our own minds, as much as from external sources of confusion. In many tantric mandalas, this aspect of separation and protection from the outer samsaric world is depicted by "the four outer circles: the purifying fire of wisdom, the vajra circle, the circle with the eight tombs, the lotus circle". The ring of vajras forms a connected fence-like arrangement running around the perimeter of the outer mandala circle.

As a meditation on impermanence (a central teaching of Buddhism), after days or weeks of creating the intricate pattern of a sand mandala, the sand is brushed together into a pile and spilled into a body of running water to spread the blessings of the mandala.

Kværne in his extended discussion of sahaja, discusses the relationship of sadhana interiority and exteriority in relation to mandala thus:

Offerings

A "mandala offering" in Tibetan Buddhism is a symbolic offering of the entire universe. Every intricate detail of these mandalas is fixed in the tradition and has specific symbolic meanings, often on more than one level.

Whereas the above mandala represents the pure surroundings of a Buddha, this mandala represents the universe. This type of mandala is used for the mandala-offerings, during which one symbolically offers the universe to the Buddhas or to one's teacher. Within Vajrayana practice, 100,000 of these mandala offerings (to create merit) can be part of the preliminary practices before a student even begins actual tantric practices. This mandala is generally structured according to the model of the universe as taught in a Buddhist classic text the Abhidharma-kośa, with Mount Meru at the centre, surrounded by the continents, oceans and mountains, etc.

Theravada Buddhism 
Various Mandalas are described in many Pali Buddhist texts. Some of the examples of the Theravada Buddhist Mandalas are:

 Mandala of Eight Disciples of Buddha describing the Shakyamuni Buddha at center and Eight great disciple in eight major directions.

 Mandala of Buddhas is the mandala consisting of nine major Buddhas of the past and the present Gautama Buddha occupying the ten directions.

 Mandala of Eight Devis includes the eight Devis occupying and protecting the eight corners of the Universe.

In Sigālovāda Sutta, Buddha describes the relationships of a common lay persons in Mandala style.

Shingon Buddhism

One Japanese branch of Mahayana Buddhism – Shingon Buddhism – makes frequent use of mandalas in its rituals as well, though the actual mandalas differ. When Shingon's founder, Kukai, returned from his training in China, he brought back two mandalas that became central to Shingon ritual: the Mandala of the Womb Realm and the Mandala of the Diamond Realm.

A common feature of this ritual is to blindfold the new initiate and to have them throw a flower upon either mandala. Where the flower lands assists in the determination of which tutelary deity the initiate should follow.

Sand mandalas, as found in Tibetan Buddhism, are not practiced in Shingon Buddhism.

Nichiren Buddhism 

Called the Gohonzon, it was originally inscribed by Nichiren, the founder of this branch of Japanese Buddhism, during the late 13th Century. The Gohonzon is the primary object of veneration in some Nichiren schools and the only one in others, which consider it to be the supreme object of worship as the embodiment of the supreme Dharma and Nichiren's inner enlightenment. The seven characters Namu Myōhō Renge Kyō, considered to be the name of the supreme Dharma, as well as the invocation that believers chant, are written down the center of all Nichiren-sect Gohonzons, whose appearance may otherwise vary depending on the particular school and other factors.

Pure Land Buddhism

Mandalas have sometimes been used in Pure Land Buddhism to graphically represent Pure Lands, based on descriptions found in the Larger Sutra and the Contemplation Sutra. The most famous mandala in Japan is the Taima mandala, dated to about 763 CE. The Taima mandala is based on the Contemplation Sutra, but other similar mandalas have been made subsequently. Unlike mandalas used in Vajrayana Buddhism, it is not used as an object of meditation or for esoteric ritual. Instead, it provides a visual representation of the Pure Land texts, and is used as a teaching aid.

Also in Jodo Shinshu Buddhism, Shinran and his descendant, Rennyo, sought a way to create easily accessible objects of reverence for the lower-classes of Japanese society. Shinran designed a mandala using a hanging scroll, and the words of the nembutsu written vertically. This style of mandala is still used by some Jodo Shinshu Buddhists in home altars, or butsudan.

Bodhimandala 

Bodhimaṇḍala is a term in Buddhism that means "circle of awakening".

Sand mandalas 

Sand mandalas are colorful mandalas made from sand that are ritualistically destroyed. They originated in India in the 8th-12th century but are now practiced in Tibetan Buddhism. Each mandala is dedicated to specific deities. In Buddhism Deities represent states of the mind to be obtained on the path to enlightenment, the mandala itself is representative of the deities palace which also represents the mind of the deity. Each mandala is a pictorial representation of a tantra. for the process of making Sand mandalas they are created by monks that have trained for 3-5 years in a monastery. These sand mandalas are made to be destroyed to symbolize impermanence, the Buddhist belief that death is not the end, and that one's essence will always return to the elements. It is also related to the belief that one should not become attached to anything. To create these mandalas, the monks first create a sketch, then take colorful sand traditionally made from powdered stones and gems into copper funnels called Cornetts and gently tap sand out of them to create the sand mandala. Each color represents attributes of deities. While making the mandalas the monks will pray and meditate, each grain of sand represents a blessing. Monks will travel to demonstrate this art form to people, often in museums.

Mesoamerican civilizations

Mayan Tzolk'in

The Maya civilization tended to present calendars in a form similar to a mandala. It is similar in form and function to the Kalachakra (Wheel of Time) sand paintings of Tibetan Buddhists. Maya symbolism was later used in the Dreamspell calendar, developed by José Argüelles. Sometimes described as an authentic Mayan mandala, it is "inspired by" elements of the 260-day Tzolk'in calendar (as opposed to the 365-day Haabʼ calendar).

Aztec Sun Stone

The Sun Stone is thought to be a ceremonial representation of the entire universe as seen by the Aztec religious class, in some ways resembling a mandala.

The earliest interpretations of the stone relate to its use as a calendar. In 1792, two years after the stone's unearthing, Mexican anthropologist Antonio de León y Gama wrote a treatise on the Aztec calendar using the stone as its basis. Some of the circles of glyphs are the glyphs for the days of the month. The four symbols included in the Ollin glyph represent the four past suns that the Mexica believed the earth had passed through.

Another aspect of the stone is its religious significance. One theory is that the face at the center of the stone represents Tonatiuh, the Aztec deity of the sun; it is for this reason that the stone became known as the "Sun Stone." Richard Townsend proposed a different theory, claiming that the figure at the center of the stone represents Tlaltecuhtli, the Mexica earth deity who features in Mexica creation myths. Modern archaeologists, such as those at the National Anthropology Museum in Mexico City, believe it is more likely to have been used primarily as a ceremonial basin or ritual altar for gladiatorial sacrifices than as an astrological or astronomical reference.

Yet another characteristic of the stone is its possible geographic significance. The four points may relate to the four corners of the earth or the cardinal points. The inner circles may express space as well as time.

Lastly, there is the political aspect of the stone. It may have been intended to show Tenochtitlan as the center of the world and therefore, as the center of authority. Townsend argues in favor of this idea, claiming that the small glyphs of additional dates amongst the four previous suns - 1 Flint (Tecpatl), 1 Rain (Atl), and 7 Monkey (Ozomahtli) – represent matters of historical importance to the Mexica state. He posits, for example, that 7 Monkey represents the significant day for the cult of a community within Tenochtitlan. His claim is further supported by the presence of Mexica ruler Moctezuma II's name on the work.

Christianity

The Cosmati pavements, including that at Westminster Abbey, are geometric supposedly mandala-like mosaic designs from thirteenth century Italy. The Great Pavement at Westminster Abbey is believed to embody divine and cosmic geometries as the seat of enthronement of the monarchs of England.

Similarly, many of the Illuminations of Hildegard von Bingen can be used as mandalas, as well as many of the images of esoteric Christianity, as in Christian Hermeticism, Christian Alchemy, and Rosicrucianism.

Alchemist, mathematician and astrologer John Dee developed a geometric symbol which he called the Sigillum Dei (Seal of God) manifesting a universal geometric order which incorporated the names of the archangels, derived from earlier forms of the clavicula salomonis or key of Solomon.

The Layer Monument, an early 17th-century marble mural funerary monument at the Church of Saint John the Baptist, Maddermarket, Norwich, is a rare example of Christian iconography absorbing alchemical symbolism to create a mandala in Western funerary art.

Western psychological interpretations

The re-introduction of mandalas into modern Western thought is largely credited to psychologist Carl Gustav Jung. In his exploration of the unconscious through art, Jung observed the common appearance of a circle motif across religions and cultures. He hypothesized that the circle drawings reflected the mind's inner state at the moment of creation and were a kind of symbolic archetype in the universal subconscious. Familiarity with the philosophical writings of India prompted Jung to adopt the word "mandala" to describe these drawings created by himself and his patients. In his autobiography, Jung wrote:

Jung claimed that the urge to make mandalas emerges during moments of intense personal growth. He further hypothesized their appearance indicated a "profound re-balancing process" is underway in the psyche; the result of the process would be a more complex and better integrated personality. 

American art therapist Joan Kellogg later created the MARI card test, a free response measure, based on Jung's work.

Transpersonal psychologist David Fontana proposed that the symbolic nature of a mandala may help one "to access progressively deeper levels of the unconscious, ultimately assisting the meditator to experience a mystical sense of oneness with the ultimate unity from which the cosmos in all its manifold forms arises."

In architecture

Buddhist architecture often applied mandala as the blueprint or plan to design Buddhist structures, including temple complex and stupas. A notable example of mandala in architecture is the 9th century Borobudur in Central Java, Indonesia. It is built as a large stupa surrounded by smaller ones arranged on terraces formed as a stepped pyramid, and when viewed from above, takes the form of a giant tantric Buddhist mandala, simultaneously representing the Buddhist cosmology and the nature of mind. Other temples from the same period that also have mandala plans include Sewu, Plaosan and Prambanan. Similar mandala designs are also observable in Cambodia, Thailand and Myanmar.

In science

Circular diagrams are often used in phylogenetics, especially for the graphical representation of phylogenetic relationships. Evolutionary trees often encompass numerous species that are conveniently shown on a circular tree, with images of the species shown on the periphery of a tree. Such diagrams have been called phylogenetic mandalas.

In art

Mandala as an art form first appeared in Buddhist art that were produced in India during the first century B.C.E. These can also be seen in Rangoli designs in Indian households.

In New Age, the mandala is a diagram, chart or geometric pattern that represents the cosmos metaphysically or symbolically; a time-microcosm of the universe, but it originally meant to represent wholeness and a model for the organizational structure of life itself, a cosmic diagram that shows the relation to the infinite and the world that extends beyond and within various minds & bodies.

In archaeology

One of the most intense archaeological discoveries in recent years that could redefine the history of eastern thought and tradition of mandala is the discovery of five giant mandalas in the valley of Manipur, India, made with Google Earth imagery. Located in the paddy field in the west of Imphal, the capital of Manipur, the Maklang geoglyph is perhaps the world's largest mandala built entirely of mud. The site wasn't discovered until 2013 as its whole structure could only be visible via Google Earth satellite imagery. The whole paddy field, locally known as Bihu Loukon, is now protected and announced as historical monument and site by the government of Manipur in the same year. The site is situated 12 km aerial distance from Kangla with the GPS coordinates of 24° 48' N and 93° 49' E. It covers a total area of around 224,161.45 square meters. This square mandala has four similar protruding rectangular ‘gates’ in the cardinal directions guarded each by similar but smaller rectangular ‘gates’ on the left and right. Within the square there is an eight petalled flower or rayed-star, recently called as Maklang ‘Star fort’ by the locals, in the centre covering a total area of around 50,836.66 square meters. The discovery of other five giant mandalas in the valley of Manipur is also made with Google Earth. The five giant mandalas, viz., Sekmai mandala, Heikakmapal mandala, Phurju twin mandalas and Sangolmang mandala are located on the western bank of the Iril River.  Another two fairly large mandala shaped geoglyph at Nongren and Keinou are also reported from Manipur valley, India, in 2019. They are named as Nongren mandala and Keinou mandala.

In politics

The Rajamandala (or Raja-mandala; circle of states) was formulated by the Indian author Kautilya in his work on politics, the Arthashastra (written between 4th century BCE and 2nd century BCE). It describes circles of friendly and enemy states surrounding the king's state.

In historical, social and political sense, the term "mandala" is also employed to denote traditional Southeast Asian political formations (such as federation of kingdoms or vassalized states). It was adopted by 20th century Western historians from ancient Indian political discourse as a means of avoiding the term 'state' in the conventional sense. Not only did Southeast Asian polities not conform to Chinese and European views of a territorially defined state with fixed borders and a bureaucratic apparatus, but they diverged considerably in the opposite direction: the polity was defined by its centre rather than its boundaries, and it could be composed of numerous other tributary polities without undergoing administrative integration. Empires such as Bagan, Ayutthaya, Champa, Khmer, Srivijaya and Majapahit are known as "mandala" in this sense.

In contemporary use

Fashion designer Mandali Mendrilla designed an interactive art installation called Mandala of Desires (Blue Lotus Wish Tree) made in peace silk and eco friendly textile ink, displayed at the China Art Museum in Shanghai in November 2015. The pattern of the dress was based on the Goloka Yantra mandala, shaped as a lotus with eight petals. Visitors were invited to place a wish on the sculpture dress, which will be taken to India and offered to a genuine living Wish Tree.

Gallery

See also

Citations

General sources 

 Brauen, M. (1997). The Mandala, Sacred circle in Tibetan Buddhism Serindia Press, London.
 Bucknell, Roderick & Stuart-Fox, Martin (1986). The Twilight Language: Explorations in Buddhist Meditation and Symbolism. Curzon Press: London. 
 Cammann, S. (1950). Suggested Origin of the Tibetan Mandala Paintings The Art Quarterly, Vol. 8, Detroit.
 Cowen, Painton (2005). The Rose Window, London and New York, (offers the most complete overview of the evolution and meaning of the form, accompanied by hundreds of colour illustrations.)
 Crossman, Sylvie and Barou, Jean-Pierre (1995). Tibetan Mandala, Art & Practice The Wheel of Time, Konecky and Konecky.
 Fontana, David (2005). "Meditating with Mandalas", Duncan Baird Publishers, London.
  Rochester, Vermont: Inner Traditions International.
 Mipham, Sakyong Jamgön (2002) 2000 Seminary Transcripts Book 1 Vajradhatu Publications 
 Somorjit, Wangam (2018). "World's Largest Mandalas from Manipur and Carl Jung's Archetype of the Self", neScholar, vol.04, Issue 01, ed.Dr. R.K. Nimai Singh 
 Tucci, Giuseppe (1973). The Theory and Practice of the Mandala trans. Alan Houghton Brodrick, New York, Samuel Weisner.
 Vitali, Roberto (1990). Early Temples of Central Tibet London, Serindia Publications.
 Wayman, Alex (1973). "Symbolism of the Mandala Palace" in The Buddhist Tantras Delhi, Motilal Banarsidass.

Further reading 

 Grotenhuis, Elizabeth Ten (1999). Japanese mandalas: representations of sacred geography, Honolulu: University of Hawai'i Press
  (see index)

External links 

 Introduction to Mandalas
 Mandalas in the Tradition of the Dalai Lamas' Namgyal Monastery by Losang Samten

 
Buddhist philosophical concepts
Buddhist art
Buddhist meditation
Ceremonies
Hindu philosophical concepts
Indian iconography
Meditation
Religious objects
Religious symbols
Tibetan Buddhist practices
Tibetan Buddhist ritual implements